A shoestring is used to fasten a shoe.

Shoestring may also refer to: 

In biology:
 Prairie shoestring, a shrub
 Shoestring Rot, a fungus

In entertainment:
 Shoe String Symphonettes, an album of film music
 Shoestring (TV series)
 Shoestring Radio Theatre

In geography:
 Shoestring annexation, the incorporation of new territory connected to existing territory by only a thin strip of land
 Shoestring Bay, Massachusetts, USA
 Shoestring Falls, Washington, USA
 Shoestring Glacier, Washington, USA
 Shoestring Gorge or Boom Gorge, Kyrgyzstan

In other uses:
 Condor Shoestring, a racing aircraft
 Shoestring necktie, also known as a bolo tie
 Shoestring Water bag, tied to a bag of water from the ceiling, this will scare away flies
 Shoestring potatoes, thinly-cut french fries

See also 

 
 
 Shoe (disambiguation)
 String (disambiguation)